Chachoengsao City Football Club (Thai สโมสรฟุตบอล ฉะเชิงเทรา ซิตี้), is a Thai football club based in Bang Nam Priao, Chachoengsao, Thailand. The club participates in Thailand Amateur League East Region.

History
The club was formed in 2016 at Paluru, Su-ngai Padi, Narathiwat Province. Musrudin Hami Sub-District Headman of Paluru was the club first chairman. They joined the Thai Football Division 3 (Southern Region) In 2016 season.

On 23 December 2016, they played their first official match at Wiang Sa sub-disdrict municipality stadium, Surat Thani Province and draw against Newball Satun F.C. 0–0. They were southern region runner-up in their first season.

In 2017, The Club relegated to Thailand Amateur League Southern Region because they get last position (9th) of 2017 Thai League 4 Southern Region.

In 2021, The club move to Bang Nam Priao District, Chachoengsao Province and renamed to Chachoengsao City F.C.

Current Player

Stadium and locations

Record

References
 104 ทีมร่วมชิงชัย! แบโผผลจับสลาก ดิวิชั่น 3 ฤดูกาล 2016

External links
 Facebook-page

Association football clubs established in 2016
Football clubs in Thailand
Sport in Narathiwat province
2016 establishments in Thailand